The National Basketball League (NBL) Finals is a tournament held at the end of each NBL season to determine the league champions. 

The top six teams qualify for the finals based on the regular season results. The current finals format consists of four rounds: two sudden-death play-in games then the best-of-three Semifinals and best-of-five Grand Final series.

Format

1980–1983

1984

1985

1986

1987–1988

1989–1991

1992–1996

1997–1998

1999

The top six teams at the end of the regular season advance to the finals under this playoff system:
The first round of the postseason sees the team that finishes in first place at the end of the regular season against the team that finishes sixth; second plays fifth, and third plays fourth.
The three teams that win their respective best-of-three first-round series advances, and is joined in the semifinals by the highest-placed losing team from the first round.
Teams are then seeded again for the best-of-three semifinal series. The three winning teams from the first round are seeded in order of their regular-season finishing positions, and the first-round loser automatically becomes the No. 4 seed.
The two winning teams from the semifinals meet in a best-of-three Grand Final series to determine the champion.

2000

2001–2003

The top six teams at the end of the regular season advance to the finals under this playoff system:
The first round of the postseason sees the team that finishes in first place at the end of the regular season against the team that finishes sixth; second plays fifth, and third plays fourth.
The three teams that win their respective best-of-three first-round series advances, and is joined in the semifinals by the highest-placed losing team from the first round.
Teams are then seeded again for the best-of-three semifinal series. The three winning teams from the first round are seeded in order of their regular-season finishing positions, and the first-round loser automatically becomes the No. 4 seed.
The two winning teams from the semifinals meet in a best-of-three Grand Final series to determine the champion.

2004–2008

2009

2010–2016

2017–2022 

The top four teams at the end of the regular season advance to the finals under this playoff system:
The semifinals of the postseason sees the team that finishes in first place at the end of the regular season against the team that finishes fourth; and second plays third. All four teams play a best-of-three semifinal series.
The two winning teams from the semifinals meet in a best-of-five Grand Final series to determine the champion.

2023–present

List of finals 
This is a complete listing of National Basketball League (NBL) Finals series, grouped by franchise. Series featuring relocated and/or renamed teams are kept with their ultimate relocation franchises. Bolded years indicate wins. Years in italics indicate series in progress. Tables are sorted first by the number of series, then the number of wins, and then by year of first occurrence.

Adelaide 36ers

Brisbane Bullets

Cairns Taipans

Illawarra Hawks

Melbourne United

New Zealand Breakers

Perth Wildcats

Sydney Kings

Tasmania JackJumpers

Defunct and Former Teams

Bankstown Bruins

Canberra Cannons / Hunter Pirates / Singapore Slingers

Coburg Giants / North Melbourne Giants

Geelong Supercats

Gold Coast Blaze

Launceston Casino City

Newcastle Falcons

Nunawading Spectres

St. Kilda Saints

South Dragons

South East Melbourne Magic

Sydney Supersonics

Townsville Crocodiles

Victoria Titans

West Adelaide Bearcats

West Sydney Razorbacks

Finals appearances

See also

 NBL Grand Final
 WNBL Finals
 Basketball
 Basketball in Australia
 Australia men's national basketball team
List of NBA playoff series
List of WNBA playoff series

References

External links 

 
Recurring sporting events established in 1979
Finals